Marcio Gleydson da Silva Santos, known as Marcio Santos (born Feb 22, 1987 in Brazil) is a Brazilian football player, who currently plays for Ultimate F.C. in the Malaysia M3 League. He usually plays as a midfielder. Despite playing on one of the bottom-ranking teams in Thailand, Myanmar and Laos, he has proven to be a moderate success and has scored and assisted in his recent appearances as a starter.

References

External links
list of Udon Thani fc players in Wikipedia English
Phuket football website 2012 

1987 births
Living people
Brazilian footballers
Marcio Santos
Expatriate footballers in Cambodia
Association football midfielders
Footballers from São Paulo